Robert Earl was a United States Marine lieutenant colonel and a deputy to Oliver North at the National Security Agency during the early 1980s.

Early life

Earl graduated from the U.S. Naval Academy in 1967.  He was also a Rhodes Scholar.

Iran-Contra

Earl is most famous for being involved with the 1980s Iran-Contra scandal supply effort and participated in the destruction of records. He was granted immunity for his testimony.

Oliver North had been a professional acquaintance of Robert Earl since their time together at the Naval Academy.  After graduation from the Academy, Earl and North often crossed paths during their careers.

Later career

During the George W. Bush presidency, Earl was appointed as chief of staff to acting Deputy Defense Secretary Gordon R. England.

Notes and references

External links

 From Iran-Contra To Iraq, by David Corn
 Daily Times on Earl's appointment

Year of birth missing (living people)
Living people
Iran–Contra affair
United States Marine Corps officers
United States Naval Academy alumni
American Rhodes Scholars